Ryan Savoia (born May 6, 1973) is a Canadian retired professional ice hockey centre.

Biography
Savoia was born in Thorold, Ontario. As a youth, he played in the 1987 Quebec International Pee-Wee Hockey Tournament with a minor ice hockey team from St. Catharines. He later played three games in the National Hockey League for the Pittsburgh Penguins, during the 1998–99 NHL season. Savoia was also a member of the 1999–2000 Canada men's national ice hockey team. He led the team in scoring with 21 goals, 30 assists, and 51 points.

References

External links

1973 births
Augsburger Panther players
Brock Badgers ice hockey players
Canadian ice hockey centres
Cleveland Lumberjacks players
Djurgårdens IF Hockey players
EHC Biel players
Fort Wayne Komets players
HC Fribourg-Gottéron players
HC Milano players
HIFK (ice hockey) players
Ice hockey people from Ontario
Johnstown Chiefs players
Living people
People from Thorold
Pittsburgh Penguins players
SC Bern players
SCL Tigers players
SG Cortina players
Syracuse Crunch players
Undrafted National Hockey League players
Canadian expatriate ice hockey players in Italy
Canadian expatriate ice hockey players in Finland
Canadian expatriate ice hockey players in Germany
Canadian expatriate ice hockey players in Switzerland
Canadian expatriate ice hockey players in Sweden
Canadian expatriate ice hockey players in the United States